Razuiyeh may refer to:
 Razuiyeh, Hormozgan
 Razuiyeh, Kerman